Balaklava Bay is a bay in the Black Sea near Balaklava, Crimea.

References

Bays of Sevastopol